Oribatulidae is a family of mites and ticks in the order Sarcoptiformes. There are about 19 genera and at least 200 described species in Oribatulidae.

Genera
 Capilloppia Balogh & Mahunka, 1966
 Crassoribatula Hammer, 1967
 Diphauloppia J. & P. Balogh, 1984
 Grandjeania Balogh, 1963
 Jornadia Wallwork & Weems, 1984
 Lucoppia Berlese, 1908
 Lunoribatula Mahunka, 1982
 Megatrichobates Grobler, 2000
 Neolucoppia Tseng, 1984
 Oribatula Berlese, 1896
 Ovobates Mahunka, 1994
 Paraphauloppia Hammer, 1967
 Phauloppia Berlese, 1908
 Phauloppiella Subías, 1977
 Reticuloppia Balogh & Mahunka, 1966
 Sellnickia Oudemans, 1927
 Spinoppia Higgins & Woolley, 1966
 Subphauloppia Hammer, 1967
 Zygoribatula

References

Further reading

 
 
 
 

Sarcoptiformes
Acari families